The Great Siege of Montevideo, named as Sitio Grande in Uruguayan historiography, was the siege suffered by the city of Montevideo between 1843 and 1851 during the Uruguayan Civil War.

In practice, this siege meant that Uruguay had two parallel governments:
Gobierno de la Defensa in Montevideo, led by Joaquín Suárez (1843 – 1852)
Gobierno del Cerrito (with headquarters in the present-day neighborhood of Cerrito de la Victoria), ruling the rest of the country, led by Manuel Oribe (1843 – 1851)

The siege inspired a book by the French writer Alexandre Dumas, The New Troy (1850).

See also
 Gobierno de la Defensa
 Gobierno del Cerrito
 Uruguayan Civil War

References

Bibliography
 Bruce, George Harbottle (1981). Harbottle's Dictionary of Battles. Van Nostrand Reinhold.  
 Casas, Lincoln R. Maiztegui (2005). Orientales: una historia política del Uruguay . Montevideo: Planeta.
 Levene, Ricardo (1939). Historia de la nación argentina: (desde los orígenes hasta la organización definitiva en 1862) . Buenos Aires: El Ateneo.
 McLean, David (1998) Garibaldi in Uruguay: A Reputation Reconsidered Vol. 113, No. 451. The English Historical Review. (Apr., 1998), pp. 351–66.
 Núñez, Estuardo (1979). Tradiciones hispanoamericanas . Caracas: Fundación Biblioteca Ayacucho. 
 Rela, Walter (1998). Uruguay cronología histórica anotada: República Oriental del Uruguay 1830-1864 . Montevideo: ALFAR. 
 Sahuleka, Daniel; Navia, Vicente (1886). Compendio cronológico de historia universal por Mor. Daniel . Impr. de El Laurak-Bat. 
 Saldías, Adolfo (1978). Historia de la Confederación Argentina. Tomo III . Buenos Aires: EUDEBA, Editorial Universitaria de Buenos Aires.
 Salgado, José (1943). Historia de la República Oriental del Uruguay. Tomo VIII . Montevideo: Tallares A. Barreiro y Ramos.
 Solari, Juan Antonio (1951). De la tiranía a la organización nacional: Juan Francisco Seguí, secretario de Urquiza en 1851 . Buenos Aires: Bases.

Uruguayan Civil War
Sieges
History of Montevideo
1843 in Uruguay
1851 in Uruguay
19th century in Montevideo
Montevideo